James Barrington (15 November 1901 – after 1937) was a footballer who played in the Football League for Bradford City, Wigan Borough and Nottingham Forest.

Barrington joined Wigan Borough in 1925, making 71 appearances during his two seasons at the club before being released in 1927.

References

1901 births
Year of death missing
English footballers
Association football defenders
Wigan United A.F.C. players
Bradford City A.F.C. players
Hamilton Academical F.C. players
Wigan Borough F.C. players
Winsford United F.C. players
Nottingham Forest F.C. players
English Football League players
Ollerton Colliery F.C. players